Otto E. Orf II (born November 4, 1963) is a retired American soccer goalkeeper who played professionally in the United Soccer League and Major Indoor Soccer League and National Professional Soccer League. He played one game for the U.S. at the 1996 FIFA Futsal World Championship.

Player
Orf first played soccer his sophomore year at Iroquois Central High School, trying out for goalkeeper because nobody else was interested in that position. By his senior season, he was the team MVP. Orf attended SUNY Buffalo where he played both baseball and soccer. His baseball career ended with an elbow injury his sophomore season. In 1984, he left SUNY Buffalo before his senior season to turn professional with the Buffalo Storm of the United Soccer League. The release by the Storm of their starting goalkeeper following financial difficulties brought about Orf signing on for $50 per week. In 1986, Orf signed with the Columbus Capitals of the American Indoor Soccer Association. After one season in Columbus, he moved to the Fort Wayne Flames for three seasons. He finished his Flames’ career with fifty-nine appearances and one goal. In addition to playing for the Flames, Orf backstopped the Toronto Blizzard of the Canadian Soccer League in 1987 and 1988. He also played in the National Soccer League in 1987 with Toronto Italia and later with Toronto Croatia. In April 1989, the San Diego Sockers of the Major Indoor Soccer League signed Orf. The AISA season had just ended and the Sockers were looking for a backup to Victor Nogueira after Zoltán Tóth went out injured. In 1989, Orf spent the summer playing for the San Diego Nomads of the Western Soccer League. In 1990, he played one last outdoor season, this time with the Orlando Lions of the American Professional Soccer League. In the fall of 1989, Orf signed with the Cleveland Crunch of the MISL. In 1992, the MISL collapsed and the Crunch moved to the National Professional Soccer League. In 2001, that league collapsed and the Crunch moved to the second Major Indoor Soccer League. In 2002, the Crunch became the Cleveland Force when it came under new team ownership. Orf played for Cleveland through all these changes in leagues and name before retiring in 2004.

Futsal
Orf earned eight caps with the United States national futsal team between 1996 and 2000. He played one game for the U.S. at the 1996 FIFA Futsal World Championship.

Coach
In November and December 2004, Orf served as an interim coach for the Force when Omid Namazi was suspended for three games.

References

External links
 MISL stats
 

Living people
1963 births
Futsal goalkeepers
American soccer coaches
American soccer players
American expatriate soccer players
American expatriate sportspeople in Canada
American Indoor Soccer Association players
American Professional Soccer League players
Association football goalkeepers
Buffalo Storm players
Canadian National Soccer League players
Canadian Soccer League (1987–1992) players
Cleveland Crunch (original MISL) players
Cleveland Crunch (NPSL) players
Cleveland Force (2002–2005 MISL) players
Expatriate soccer players in Canada
Fort Wayne Flames players
Major Indoor Soccer League (1978–1992) players
Major Indoor Soccer League (2001–2008) coaches
National Professional Soccer League (1984–2001) players
Orlando Lions players
People from Elma, New York
Nomads Soccer Club players
Toronto Blizzard (1986–1993) players
Toronto Croatia players 
Toronto Italia players
United Soccer League (1984–85) players
Western Soccer Alliance players
American men's futsal players